Ekaterina Vladimirovna Riazanova (born 6 April 1991) is a Russian former competitive ice dancer. With former partner Ilia Tkachenko, she is the 2010 Trophée Eric Bompard silver medalist, the 2012 Skate Canada bronze medalist, and a three-time Russian national medalist.

Career

Early career 
Riazanova's parents put her in skating to improve her health. She skated in singles until ankle problems led her to take up ice dancing under coach Svetlana Alexeeva. She skated for six months with her first partner, Kirill Vakhnenko, and then teamed up with Jonathan Guerreiro in the summer of 2006. Riazanova/Guerreiro competed together for three seasons and won the bronze medal at the 2009 World Junior Championships. They were coached by Elena Kustarova and Svetlana Alexeeva at Blue Bird FSC in Moscow.

Senior career 
In spring 2009, Ilia Tkachenko expressed interest in skating with Riazanova. After a tryout, they both felt it would be a good partnership, despite her needing time to adapt to his different technique and some disapproval from the Russian skating federation. They were coached by Alexei Gorshkov at Odintsovo FSC, near Moscow.

Riazanova/Tkachenko began competing together during the 2009–10 season. They finished fourth at the 2009 Nebelhorn Trophy, sixth at their sole Grand Prix event, the 2009 Cup of Russia, and fourth at the Russian Nationals.

Riazanova/Tkachenko decided to scrap the free dance they had planned for the 2010–11 season and prepare a new one. They placed fifth at their first Grand Prix event of the season, the 2010 Skate America, and then won silver at the 2010 Trophée Eric Bompard. At the 2011 Russian Nationals, they won the silver medal and their first berth to the European Championships. At the 2011 Europeans, Riazanova/Tkachenko placed fifth in the short dance, sixth in the free dance, and sixth overall. Russia had only two spots to the World Championships and since both Bobrova/Soloviev and Ilinykh/Katsalapov had placed ahead of them at Europeans, they did not make the team, however, they continued training as first alternates and also worked on new programs until the end of May; after vacation, they resumed training for the new season on 20 June, including a three-week camp in Bulgaria.

For the 2011–12 season, Riazanova/Tkachenko were assigned to 2011 Skate Canada and 2011 Cup of Russia as their Grand Prix events. On their free dance, which was choreographed by Sergei Petukhov, Riazanova said, "A young woman remembers her beloved, who is no longer alive. She is so deeply immersed in the memories of happy times that her dreams seem to become reality for a short while." They had to withdraw from 2011 Nebelhorn Trophy because Tkachenko's new passport was not ready. On 13 December 2011, Riazanova sustained a concussion and a broken nose when Tkachenko accidentally elbowed her in practice; she was released from hospital at her own risk on 20 December. At the Russian Championships which began on 25 December, Riazanova/Tkachenko won the bronze medal after placing third in the short dance and fourth in the free dance. They finished 5th overall at the 2012 European Championships but received a small bronze medal for their 3rd place in the short dance. They finished 9th at the 2012 World Championships.

In April 2012, Tkachenko said they would spend some time preparing for the following season in Marina Zueva and Igor Shpilband's group in the U.S., however, the coaches parted ways so the skaters decided to train with Shpilband in Novi, Michigan. At a camp in Bulgaria, Tkachenko lost his balance while practicing a lift on the floor in skates and stepped on Riazanova's hand; she had surgery on her hand and recovered well. At the suggestion of Tatiana Tarasova, they decided to scrap a new free dance to Pink Floyd's Hey You and made a new one to a waltz from the Godfather films. Riazanova/Tkachenko won bronze medals at the 2012 Skate Canada and 2012 Trophée Eric Bompard. They repeated as bronze medalists at the 2013 Russian Championships.

In the 2013–14 season, Riazanova/Tkachenko finished fourth in their two Grand Prix events, the 2013 Skate Canada and the 2013 Rostelecom Cup. They then finished fourth at the 2014 Russian Championships behind Victoria Sinitsina / Ruslan Zhiganshin. On 24 April 2014, Riazanova announced that they had parted ways and that she was seeking a new partner to continue her career.

Riazanova had a tryout with Italy's Simone Vaturi. In May 2014, she stated that the Russian federation had agreed to release her to skate for another country.

Personal life 
Ekaterina Riazanova's father, Vladimir, was a member of the Russian national rugby team. She has an older brother. Riazanova studied at the Institute of Physiculture.

Programs

With Tkachenko

With Guerreiro

Competitive highlights

With Vaturi

With Tkachenko

With Guerreiro

References

External links 

 
 

1991 births
Living people
Russian female ice dancers
Figure skaters from Moscow
World Junior Figure Skating Championships medalists